Scotland is an unincorporated community and census-designated place (CDP) in Greene Township, Franklin County, Pennsylvania, United States. The community was named after Scotland, the ancestral home of an early settler. As of the 2010 census, the population was 1,353.

The Chambersburg Mall is located in the area, next to the Scotland exit of I-81. The Scotland School for Veterans' Children was long part of the community.

Geography
Scotland is located in eastern Franklin County, near the center of Greene Township. Interstate 81 passes through the southeastern side of the community, with access from Exit 20. I-81 leads southwest  to Chambersburg, the county seat, and northeast  to Carlisle. Pennsylvania Route 997 passes along the northeastern edge of the community, leading northwest  to U.S. Route 11 at Green Village, and southeast  between Fayetteville and Caledonia State Park.

Conococheague Creek, a tributary of the Potomac River, forms the southwestern edge of the community.

Scotland School for Veterans' Children
The Scotland School for Veterans' Children was located in Scotland until Governor Rendell forced the school to close in 2009 by eliminating the state funding.

Scotland was originally built as a school for orphaned children shortly after the Civil War.  It was then converted into a school for children in grades 3-12 that had family members in the military.

Geology
The type section of the Conococheague Formation, a Cambrian limestone and dolomite, is located in Scotland.

In popular culture
The 2001 film Scotland, PA is set in the community of Scotland, though it was not filmed there. It is a modern retelling of Shakespeare's Macbeth, set in a fast food restaurant.

See also
 Chambersburg, Pennsylvania: Scotland School for Veterans' Children

References 

Census-designated places in Franklin County, Pennsylvania
Census-designated places in Pennsylvania
Unincorporated communities in Pennsylvania
Unincorporated communities in Franklin County, Pennsylvania